Knebworth House is an English country house in the parish of Knebworth in Hertfordshire, England. It is a Grade II* listed building. Its gardens are also listed Grade II* on the Register of Historic Parks and Gardens. In its surrounding park is the medieval St. Mary's Church and the Lytton family mausoleum. It was the seat of the Earl of Lytton (also Viscount Knebworth), and now the house of the family of the Baron Cobbold of Knebworth.

The grounds are home to the Knebworth Festival, a recurring open-air rock and pop concert held since 1974, and until 2014 was home to another hard rock festival, Sonisphere.

History

The home of the Lytton family since 1490, when Thomas Bourchier sold the reversion of the manor to Sir Robert Lytton, Knebworth House was originally a red-brick Late Gothic manor house, built round a central court as an open square. In 1813-16 the house was reduced to its west wing, which was remodelled in a Tudor Gothic style by John Biagio Rebecca for Mrs Bulwer-Lytton, and then was transformed in 1843-45 by Henry Edward Kendall Jr. into the present Tudor Gothic structure.

Knebworth's most famous resident was Edward Bulwer-Lytton (1803-1873), the Victorian author, dramatist and statesman, who embellished the gardens in a formal Italianate fashion. The 1st Baron's great-grandson Neville (1879-1951) married Judith Blunt, a well known horse breeder who inherited Crabbet Arabian Stud in 1917 and devoted her life to it. In 1913-1914 the house was leased for £3,000 per year by Grand Duke Michael Alexandrovich of Russia and his morganatic wife Natalia Brasova.

Much of the interior of Knebworth House was redesigned by Sir Edwin Lutyens, who married Lady Emily Bulwer-Lytton (1874-1964) - he simplified the main parterre. Lady Emily was the daughter of the 1st Earl of Lytton, who served as Viceroy of India between 1876 and 1880. A herb garden, with an interlaced quincunx design, was drawn by Gertrude Jekyll in 1907, although not planted until 1982. The grounds are also open to the public.

Henry Lytton-Cobbold, 3rd Baron Cobbold, lives at the house with his family. After a career in the film industry in Los Angeles, he lets production companies film on location in the house and gardens. The grounds include tourist attractions such as an adventure playground and dinosaur park and host various events including classic car rallies.

Music festival
Beginning in 1974, a recurring open-air rock and pop concert known as the Knebworth Festival has been held in the grounds. The festival first occurred in July 1974 when The Allman Brothers Band, The Doobie Brothers and other artists played to an audience of 60,000 people. Over the years the festival has featured the likes of Pink Floyd, The Rolling Stones, Led Zeppelin, Lynyrd Skynyrd, Queen (their 1986 concert at the venue their last with Freddie Mercury), Paul McCartney, Genesis, Mike Oldfield, The Beach Boys, Deep Purple, Eric Clapton, Elton John, Dire Straits, Robbie Williams, Oasis and Liam Gallagher. The last festival to date was in June 2022.

Media

Films and television
Productions that have been filmed at Knebworth include:
 Anastasia (1956) - palace of the Empress
 Danger Man - "The Sanctuary" (1959)
 The Champions - "The Night People" (1967)
 The Avengers - "Invasion of the Earthmen" (1967/68)
 Decline and Fall... of a Birdwatcher (1968)
 Randall and Hopkirk (Deceased) - "Somebody Just Walked Over My Grave" (1969) 
 Carry On Henry - Exterior shots (1970)
 The Persuaders! - opening credits (1970/71)
 The Adventurer - "Action!" (1972)
 Horror Hospital (1973)
 Keep It Up Downstairs (1976) - filmed entirely on location as the fictitious 'Cockshute Towers'
 The Big Sleep (1978) - General Sternwood's country mansion
 The Great Muppet Caper (1981) - exterior of the Mallory Gallery
 Sir Henry at Rawlinson End (1980) - interior and exterior
 The Shooting Party (1985) - filmed entirely on location
 Haunted Honeymoon (1986) - exterior of the home
 Porterhouse Blue (1987) - interior and exterior of the home of Sir Cathcart D'Eath
 The Lair of the White Worm (1988) - exterior of the D'Ampton mansion
 Batman (1989) - exterior and some interior scenes of Bruce Wayne's manor
 A Bit of Fry & Laurie - Season Four, Episode 6 ("The Duke of Northhampton") (1995) - sketch
 The Canterville Ghost (1996)
Jane Eyre (1997) - Thornfield Hall
 Sacred Flesh (1999) - exterior scenes of the convent
Harry Potter and the Philosopher's Stone (2001) - the house was used in several pieces of promotional material for the film, and hosted the film's international launch, though no parts of the house were used in shooting of the film itself
 Agent Cody Banks 2: Destination London (2004) - some scenes in and around the grounds
 Foyle's War  Series 3 Episode 2 ("Enemy Fire")  (2004) - as the fictional Digby Manor
 St Trinian's 2: The Legend of Fritton's Gold (2009) - used as the St. Trinian's all girl school
 Jonathan Creek - provided the location of Metropolis (2008 Christmas Special)
 The King's Speech (2010) - Balmoral Party and other scenes
 Agatha Christie's Marple (2010) - significant interior and exterior scenes, including in Season 1, Episode 3, "4.50 from Paddington," with Knebworth House and estate standing in for the fictional Rutherford Hall
 The Hour (2011) - Lord Elms residence
 The Scapegoat (2012) - significant interior and exterior scenes
 Midsomer Murders Series 15 Episode 1 ("The Dark Rider") - significant exterior scenes
 Woman Like Me (2018 music video) - Little Mix
 Eurovision Song Contest: The Story of Fire Saga (2020) - exterior shots of Alexander Lemtov's British house
 Meerkat Music Presents: Little Mix Uncancelled (2020 Virtual Concert)
 The Nevers (Season 1 Episodes 3 and 4) (2021-) - exterior scenes
 Knebworth 1996  - Oasis: Knebworth 1996 (2021) - Concert Documentary surrounding Oasis' record-breaking 1996 concerts at Knebworth Park. Also released as a live album
You (season 4) - American psychological thriller television series
The Flash (2023) - Exterior of Wayne Manor on Earth-89

Radio
Local radio station BOB FM broadcasts from Knebworth's former pump house, which used to provide water to the main house.

See also
 Homewood, Knebworth, the dower house

Notes

External links

 Knebworth House website
 Flickr Knebworth House Photo Group
 Cobbold Family History
 Knebworth House on IMDb

Gardens in Hertfordshire
Gothic Revival architecture in Hertfordshire
Country houses in Hertfordshire
Herb gardens
Historic house museums in Hertfordshire
Grade II* listed buildings in Hertfordshire
Lytton family
Grade II* listed houses
Wrestling venues
Grade II* listed parks and gardens in Hertfordshire
Works of Edwin Lutyens in England
House